The BrahMos (also designated as PJ-10) is a medium-range ramjet supersonic cruise missile that can be launched from submarine, ships, airplanes or land, notably being the fastest supersonic cruise missile in the world at the time of its introduction. It is a joint-venture between the Indian Defence Research and Development Organisation (DRDO) and the Russian Federation's NPO Mashinostroyeniya, who together have formed BrahMos Aerospace. The name BrahMos is a portmanteau formed from the names of two rivers, the Brahmaputra of India and the Moskva of Russia.

The land-launched and ship-launched versions are already in service. An air-launched variant of BrahMos appeared in 2012 and entered service in 2019. A hypersonic version of the missile, BrahMos-II, is also presently under development with a speed of Mach 7–8 to boost aerial fast strike capability. It was expected to be ready for testing by 2024.

Its propulsion is based on the Russian missile, and missile guidance has been developed by BrahMos Aerospace. The missile is expected to reach a total order of US$13 billion.

In 2016, as India became a member of the Missile Technology Control Regime (MTCR), India and Russia are now planning to jointly develop a new generation of Brahmos missiles with 800 km range and an ability to hit protected targets with pinpoint accuracy. Plans are to eventually upgrade all missiles to a range of 1,500 km.

Origin

The BrahMos has been developed as a joint venture between the Defence Research and Development Organisation (DRDO) of India and the Federal State Unitary Enterprise NPO Mashinostroyenia (NPOM) of Russia as BrahMos Aerospace via an inter-government agreement.

Since late 2004, the missile has undergone several tests from a variety of platforms, including a land based test from the Pokhran range in the desert, in which the evasive 'S' maneuver at Mach 2.8 was demonstrated for the Indian Army and a launch in which the land attack capability from sea was demonstrated.

Keltec (now known as BrahMos Aerospace Trivandrum Ltd or BATL), an Indian state-owned firm, was acquired by BrahMos Corporation in 2008. Approximately  will be invested in the facility to make BrahMos components and integrate the missile systems. This was necessitated by the increased order book of the missile system, with orders having been placed by both the Indian Army and Navy. Initially, Russia supplied 65% of the BrahMos' components, including its ramjet engine and radar seeker. Currently 65% of the missile is manufactured in India and there are plans to increase this to 85% by replacing the components with an Indian made seeker and booster.

Development

Surface-to-surface variants

BrahMos was first test-fired on 12 June 2001 from the Integrated Test Range (ITR), Chandipur in a vertical launch configuration. On 14 June 2004, another test was conducted at ITR and BrahMos was fired from a mobile launcher. On 5 March 2008, the land attack version of the missile was fired from the destroyer  and the missile hit and destroyed the right target among a group of targets. The vertical launch of BrahMos was conducted on 18 December 2008 from INS Ranvir. The BrahMos I Block-I for the army was successfully tested with new capabilities in the deserts of Rajasthan, at a test range near Pokharan in December 2004 and March 2007.
During a user trial on 20 January 2009, BrahMos was tested with a new navigation system but it failed to hit the target. BrahMos Aerospace Corporation's director Dr A. Sivathanu Pillai said, "The missile performance was absolutely normal until the last phase, but the missile missed the target, though it maintained the direction." and that "The problem was in the software, not hardware". The Defence Research and Development Organisation (DRDO) said that there were "small hitches" in the last stage of the test firing due to delay in input of satellite navigation input to the Inertial Navigation System, the missile travelled for 112 seconds instead of the slated 84 seconds and fell 7 km away from the target. According to BrahMos Corporation, another test of the new missile was to be conducted within one month, but it was eventually conducted on 4 March 2009 and was deemed successful. BrahMos was test-fired again on 29 March 2009. For the test, the missile had to identify a building among a cluster of buildings in an urban environment. BrahMos successfully hit the intended target in two and a half minutes of launch. According to official sources, "The new seeker is unique and would help us to hit our targets, which are insignificant in terms of size, in a cluster of large buildings. India is now the only nation in the world with this advanced technology". After the third test, Lt Gen Noble Thamburaj, said that the Indian Army wanted the BrahMos to achieve high standards of accuracy and congratulated the scientists on behalf of the Indian Army. The Indian Army confirmed that the test was successful and the army is satisfied with the missile. This marking the completion of the development phase of BrahMos Block-II, and it was ready for induction.

The 5 September 2010 test of BrahMos created a world record for being the first cruise missile to be tested at supersonic speeds in a steep-dive mode. The missile was test-fired from the integrated test range launching complex-3 (LC-3) at Chandipur around 11.35 am. With this launch, the Indian army's requirement for land attacks with Block-II advanced seeker software with target discriminating capabilities was met. BrahMos became the only supersonic cruise missile possessing advanced capability of selection of a particular land target amongst a group of targets, providing an edge to the user with precise hit.

Block III has advanced guidance and upgraded software, incorporating high manoeuvres at multiple points and steep dive from high altitude. It will be deployed in Arunachal Pradesh. It can engage ground targets from an altitude as low as 10 metres for surgical strikes without any collateral damage. It is capable of being launched from multiple platforms like submarines, ships, aircraft and land based Mobile Autonomous Launchers (MAL). On 12 August 2011, it was test-fired by ground forces and met all mission parameters.

The new navigation system uses an Indian chip called G3OM (GPS, GLONASS, GAGAN on a Module). The system weighs around 17 grams, and gives accuracy below five metres using Indian, US and Russian navigation satellites. The system can be used in tandem with an Inertial Navigation System (INS) to provide high-accuracy targeting without using any seeker.

BrahMos was tested with an Indian seeker for the first time on 22 March 2018, and was tested with an India-developed propulsion system, airframe and power supply on 30 September 2019.

On 30 September 2020, India successfully test-fired an extended range BrahMos supersonic cruise missile. The supersonic cruise missile is capable of hitting targets at more than 400 km range. The test was carried out under BrahMos project of the Defence Research and Development Organisation (DRDO), under which the missile was launched with an indigenous booster. The missile was launched from a land-based facility in Odisha.

This is the second test-firing of the extended range version of the missile which has an indigenously developed airframe and booster.

Submarine-launched variant 
The submarine-launched variant of Brahmos was test fired successfully for the first time from a submerged pontoon near Visakhapatnam at the coast of Bay of Bengal on 20 March 2013. This was the first vertical launch of an Indian supersonic missile from a submerged platform. In late January 2016, Russia confirmed that future Indian-made submarines would be armed with smaller version of the missile that could fit inside a torpedo tube.

Air-launched variant

BrahMos-A
The BrahMos-A is a modified air-launched variant of the missile with a range of 500 km which can be launched from a Sukhoi Su-30MKI as a standoff weapon. To reduce the missile's weight to 2.55 tons, many modifications were made like using a smaller booster, adding fins for airborne stability after launch, and relocating the connector. It can be released from the height of 500 to 14,000 metres (1,640 to 46,000 ft). After release, the missile free falls for 100–150 metres, then goes into a cruise phase at 14,000 metres and finally the terminal phase at 15 metres. BrahMos Aerospace planned to deliver the missile to the IAF in 2015, where it is expected to arm at least three squadrons. A Su-30MKI is able to only carry one BrahMos missile.

The missile was also planned to arm the Indian Navy's Ilyushin Il-38 and Tupolev Tu-142 maritime patrol and anti-submarine aircraft with 6 missiles per aircraft, but this could not be made possible due to insufficient ground clearance of the IL-38, high cost of modifying the Tu-142 and the questionable benefits of modifying an ageing fleet.

The air-launched version for the Indian Air Force was ready for testing in 2008. An expert committee from the DRDO and the Indian Air Force (IAF) had ruled out any structural modifications to the Su-30MKI to carry the missile. On 22 October 2008, A. Sivathanu Pillai, Chief Controller, R&D, DRDO and CEO and managing director of BrahMos Aerospace, announced that trials and tests were to be carried out by 2011, and the IAF would get its own version of BrahMos by 2012.

On 10 January 2009, it was reported that two Indian Air Force Su-30MKI fighter jets were sent to Russia for a retrofit program that would enable them to launch the missile. On 8 August 2009, Alexander Leonov, Director of the Russian Machine Building Research and Production Centre, said "we are ready for test launches." He also said that a new takeoff engine for the launching of the missile in air and at extremely high altitudes had been developed, and the initial test firing of the missile would be undertaken from the Su-30 MKI but did not specify the dates. On 26 February 2012, A. Sivathanu Pillai said that the air-launched version of BrahMos is being developed and will be tested by the end of 2012. This version of the BrahMos missile will use air-breathing scramjet propulsion technology and would be more fuel-efficient than a traditional rocket-powered missile.

This would include funds for the integration and testing of the BrahMos on Su-30MKI of the IAF. As per this plan, the first test of the air-launched version of the missile was to be conducted by December 2012. Two Su-30MKI of the IAF would be modified by the HAL at its Nashik facility where they will also be integrated with the missile's aerial launcher.

A demonstration flight was carried out at Hindustan Aeronautics Limited Nashik on 25 June 2016 as a modified Su-30MKI carrying BrahMos-A underwent a successful trial flight, the first time a heavyweight supersonic cruise missile had been integrated on a long-range fighter aircraft; the project to adapt the weapon for air launch was approved in 2011, but was bogged down with technology transfer and intellectual property rights concerns. To carry the missile, the Su-30MKI undercarriage had to be strengthened, which also required new hard points and structural modifications. The cost of adapting the BrahMos for air launch was "phenomenal," but efforts to downsize the missile were abandoned after an attempt to reduce the size of the ramjet. On 22 November 2017, the missile was successfully test fired for the first time from a Sukhoi-30MKI against a sea-based target in the Bay of Bengal. This made the Indian Air Force the first in the world to have successfully tested such a type of air launched trisonic-class missile on a sea-based target. After the IAF successfully tested Brahmos from a Su-30MKI against a sea-based target, it declared on 17 December 2019 that the integration of BrahMos-A on Su-30 MKI is completed.

50 IAF SU-30MKI will be modified to carry the BrahMos-A missile, these modified Su-30MKIs will have electronic circuits capable of withstanding nuclear electromagnetic pulse. According to the CEO of BrahMos Aerospace, Sudhir Kumar Mishra, Brahmos-A can reach targets thousands of kilometres away considering the range of launch aircraft. On 20 January 2020, the IAF commissioned its first squadron of Su-30MKI fighters equipped with the BrahMos-A missile. IAF plans to procure 200 BrahMos-A missiles.

IAF test fired BrahMos-A from Su-30MKI on 8 December 2021 and is now ready to enter mass production. The test validated the structural integrity and functional performance. Major airframe assemblies such as non-metallic air frame sections comprising Ramjet fuel tank and pneumatic fuel supply system which form the integral part of the Ramjet Engine are now locally developed.

Testing

Further developments

Extended range
In 2016, India became a member of the MTCR. India and Russia are now planning to jointly develop a new generation of Brahmos missiles with 1500 km-plus range and an ability to hit protected targets with pinpoint accuracy. On 24 November 2020, DRDO successfully test fired upgraded 800 km BrahMos variant. This upgrade will also be applied to all existing BrahMos missiles.

BrahMos-II

BrahMos-II is a hypersonic cruise missile currently under development and is estimated to have a range of 600 km. With a speed of Mach 8, it will have double the speed of the current BrahMos missile, and it will be the fastest hypersonic missile in the world. Development could take 7–8 years to complete.

BrahMos-NG 

BrahMos-NG (Next Generation) is a mini version based on the existing BrahMos system. It will have same 290 km range and Mach 3.5 speed but it will weigh around 1.5 tons, with a length of 6 metres and a diameter of 50 cm, making BrahMos-NG 50 percent lighter and three metres shorter than its predecessor. The system is expected to be inducted on the year 2024. BrahMos-NG will have lesser RCS (radar cross section) compared to its predecessor, making it harder for air defense systems to locate and engage the target. BrahMos-NG will have Land, Air, Ship-borne and Submarine tube-launched variants. The first test flight is expected to take place in 2022–24. Initially Brahmos-NG was referred to as Brahmos-M. Additionally, the BrahMos-NG will have an AESA radar rather than the mechanically scanned one on the BrahMos.

The missile will arm the Sukhoi Su-30MKI, Mikoyan MiG-29K, HAL Tejas and future inductions such as the Dassault Rafale, and HAL MWF. Submarine launched variant will be capable of being fired from the new P75I class of submarines. A model of the new variant was showcased on 20 February 2013, at the 15th anniversary celebrations of BrahMos Corporations. The Sukhoi SU-30MKI would carry three missiles while other combat aircraft would carry one each.

BrahMos Aerospace is planning to manufacture BrahMos-NG in Uttar Pradesh. The Indian Air Force already confirmed a requirement of 400 missile that will cost around ₹8,000 crore and be delivered within 5 years of time period. The missile is likely to be ready in late 2022.

UCAV variant 
The former President of India, A. P. J. Abdul Kalam asked BrahMos Aerospace to develop an advanced version of the BrahMos cruise missile to maintain India's lead in the field. He stated that a hypersonic version of BrahMos would be needed that could deliver its payload and return to base.

Specifications

BrahMos has the capability of attacking surface targets by flying as low as five metres in altitude and the maximum altitude it can fly is 15,000 metres. It has a diameter of 70 cm and a wingspan of 1.7 m. It can gain a speed of Mach 3.5, and has a maximum range of 650 km. The ship-launched and land-based missiles can carry a 200 kg warhead, whereas the aircraft-launched variant (BrahMos A) can carry a 300 kg warhead. It has a two-stage propulsion system, with a solid-propellant rocket for initial acceleration and a liquid-fuelled ramjet responsible for sustained supersonic cruise. Air-breathing ramjet propulsion is much more fuel-efficient than rocket propulsion, giving the BrahMos a longer range than a pure rocket-powered missile would achieve.

The high speed of the BrahMos likely gives it better target-penetration characteristics than lighter subsonic cruise-missiles, such as Tomahawk. Being twice as heavy and almost four times as fast as Tomahawk, the BrahMos has more than 32 times the on-cruise kinetic energy of a Tomahawk missile, although it carries only 3/5 the payload and a fraction of the range, which suggests that the missile was designed with a different tactical role. Its Mach 2.8 speed means that it cannot be intercepted by some existing missile defence systems and its precision makes it lethal to water targets.

Although BrahMos was primarily an anti-ship missile, the BrahMos Block III can also engage land-based targets. It can be launched either in a vertical or inclined position and is capable of covering targets over a 360-degree horizon. The BrahMos missile has an identical configuration for land, sea, and sub-sea platforms. The air-launched version has a smaller booster and additional tail fins for added stability during launch. The BrahMos has currently been configured for aerial deployment with the Su-30MKI as its carrier. On 5 September 2010 BrahMos created a record for the first supersonic steep dive. The BrahMos missile also utilises a "fire-and-forget" system, requiring no additional input from the operator once the missile has been launched.

Variants

Surface-launched, Block I
 Ship-launched, anti-ship variant (Operational)
 Ship-launched, land-attack variant (Operational)
 Land-launched, land-attack variant (Operational)
 Land-launched, anti-ship variant (In induction)

Surface-launched, upgraded variants
 BrahMos Block II land-attack variant (Operational)
 BrahMos Block III land-variant (In induction)
 Anti-aircraft carrier variant (tested in March 2012) – the missile gained the capability to attack aircraft carriers using the supersonic vertical dive variant of the missile that could travel up to 290 km.

Air-launched
 Air-launched, anti-ship variant (Operational)
 Air-launched, land-attack variant (Operational)

Submarine-launched
 Submarine-launched, anti-ship variant – Tested successfully for the first time from a submerged pontoon on 20 March 2013.
 Submarine-launched, land-attack variant (under development, expected completion in 2011)

Operators

India and Russia intend to make 2,000 BrahMos supersonic cruise missiles over the next ten years through their joint venture company, and nearly 50% of them are expected to be exported to friendly countries. The Brahmos headquarters complex is located at New Delhi and consists of a design centre and aerospace knowledge centre. The integration complex is located at Hyderabad and a production centre is located at Thiruvananthapuram. Another assembly line is being established at Pilani.

India

Indian Army
The Brahmos Block was inducted into the army on 21 June 2007. The Brahmos has been inducted in three regiments of the Indian Army. The army has raised one regiment (numbered 861) of the Mark I and two missile regiments of the BrahMos Mark II, numbered 881 and 1889. The first regiment with five mobile launcher cost $83 million to set up. Each of the two new regiments would have between four and six batteries of three to four Mobile Autonomous Launchers (72 missiles per regiment) that can be connected to a mobile command post. All these regiments will be part of the army's existing 40th and 41st Artillery Divisions. Two more regiments were inducted in 2018. The known operational BrahMos regiments are:

861 Missile Regiment (BrahMos Block I, part of 40 Artillery Division)
881 Missile Regiment (BrahMos Block II, part of 41 Artillery Division)
1889 Missile Regiment (Kargil) (BrahMos Block II, part of 42 Artillery Division)

India has deployed Brahmos along with long range cruise missile Nirbhay and Akash surface to air missile to deter Chinese aggression along the Line of Actual Control in eastern Ladakh.

Indian Air Force
Thanjavur AFS: 47 Wing
No. 222 Squadron (Tigersharks) (Air launched Brahmos)

Indian Navy
The following ship classes of the navy are equipped with BrahMos:

 Visakhapatnam-class destroyer
 Kolkata-class destroyer 
Delhi-class destroyer - INS Delhi (D61)
 Rajput-class destroyer – INS Ranvir and INS Ranvijay
Nilgiri-class frigate (yet to be inducted)
 Shivalik-class frigate
 Talwar-class frigate – 3 later ships, INS Teg, INS Tarkash, INS Trikand

Philippines
In 2021 March, the Department of National Defense (DND) signed an arms agreement with India to potentially acquire Indian weapons, including the BrahMos missile.

Philippine Marine Corps

In 2017, the Shore-based Antiship Missile System Acquisition Project for the maritime force was first conceptualized, while in 2020 the Office of the President approved its inclusion in the Horizon 2 Priority Projects.

In 2021 December 27, two special allotment release orders (SARO) — worth Php 1.3 billion (₹190 crore) and Php 1.535 billion (₹224 crore) — were issued by the Department of Budget Management (DBM) for the Shore-Based Anti-Ship Missile System Acquisition Project of the Philippine Navy. The SARO allows the DND to finalise contracts for military projects.

In 2021 December 31, Brahmos Aerospace Pvt Ltd's representatives received the Notice of Award (NOA) for the project worth US$374,962,800. A contract signed on 28 January 2022. It includes at least 3 batteries as part of the agreement. A battery will have at least 3 mobile firing units, plus attached command and control, radar, and support vehicles and units. Each mobile firing unit has 3 ready-to-fire BrahMos anti-ship supersonic missiles, with the export variant having a maximum range of around 290 kilometers.

The batteries will be operated by the Shore-Based Anti-Ship Missile (SBASM) Battalion of the Philippine Marine Corps' Coastal Defense Regiment.

Potential users

Russia
In September 2016, it was revealed that the Russian Defense Ministry is interested in purchasing the air-launched BrahMos to arm their Su-30SM fighters. So far, Russia has not purchased the missile system for the Russian Air Force.

The Brahmos could be fitted to only few, if any, of the new ships of the Russian Navy. The updated Gorshkov-class frigates which are the latest type of frigate being built could possibly accommodate the missile. No Brahmos missile has been bought and inducted by the navy.

Philippines

Philippine Army
In 2019 October, the Philippine Army was reported to be in discussion with India for a possible BrahMos missile sale for at least 2 batteries to be acquired under the Land Based Missile System Acquisition (LBMS) Project. These systems are planned to be operated by the 1st Land Based Missile System Battery of the Army Artillery Regiment, which was activated in 2019 October also.

In 2022 January 21, the Philippine Army announced plans to purchase two of BrahMos medium-range missile defense systems within the 3rd horizon of the Revised Armed Forces of the Philippines Modernization Program (R-AFPMP) scheduled at the start of 2023 to the end of 2027.

Others
BrahMos Aerospace has said that several Southeast Asian and Latin American countries have expressed interest in the system, with particular interest in naval and coastal defense versions, and that a "definite list of countries" exists. These countries are Brazil, Brunei, Chile, Indonesia, Egypt, Malaysia, Oman, South Africa, Venezuela, and Vietnam. In the case of Malaysia, they are considering the purchase of the missile for use on its Kedah class warships and fighter jets. The intergovernmental agreement between India and Russia to develop the BrahMos stipulates that both countries would have to approve an export sale.

One of the major issues regarding sales of the missile is that the nations looking to buy may have stressful relations with allies and trading partners of Russia. China is one of the main nations that has objections about its neighbours getting these missiles for their navies. It views the selling of these missiles as an act of belligerence and interference in the disputed territories like the South China Sea. China's concerns were believed to be a direct cause behind the unsuccessful sale of BrahMos to Vietnam even though Vietnam, in fact, has previously acquired and commissioned the Russian Bastion-P coastal defence systems which use the largely-equivalent Yakhont anti-ship missile.

Accidents and incidents 

 20 January 2009 – On a test launch, an early developmental variant of the BrahMos missile missed its target at the Pokhran Test Range by 7 km, due to the switching off of GPS satellites and erroneous data from the INS series of satellites. A repeat mission on 4 March 2009 was a success.
 12 July 2021 – In a test fire off the coast of Odisha, an extended-range variant of the missile fell off shortly after launch, reportedly due to an error in the propulsion system.
 9 March 2022 – An accidentally fired missile crashed into Pakistan. Pakistan said that the missile took off on the evening of 9 March and it was picked up by its Air Defence systems. From its initial course, the missile suddenly manoeuvred towards Pakistani territory and crashed near Mian Channu city of Punjab province, causing no civilian casualties. Pakistan strongly condemned the incident and also cautioned India against recurrence of any such incident in the future. India said the incident was due to a "technical malfunction" and that it was "deeply regrettable". India also said that they have ordered a high-level Court of Inquiry to look into the incident. While still unconfirmed by both the Indian and Pakistani authorities, sources say that the missile fired was a BrahMos. According to Times of India, conventional missiles like the BrahMos also don't have self-destruct mechanisms like the ones available on India's strategic or nuclear missiles. ThePrint, quoting unnamed sources, stated that Pakistan's Air Defence systems were not able to track the missile down and the missile did not veer off from its trajectory and followed the trajectory that it would have in case of a conflict.

See also

 P-800 Oniks
 CX-1 Missile Systems
 CVS401 Perseus
 YJ-12
 Boeing X-51
 RATTLRS
 XASM-3
 Yun Feng

References

External links

 

Cruise missiles of India
Anti-ship cruise missiles of India
Anti-ship cruise missiles of Russia
Ramjet engines
India–Russia relations
Nuclear air-to-surface missiles
Military equipment introduced in the 2000s